Grzywna may refer to:

 grzywna (unit), a medieval weight and currency unit
 Grzywna, Kuyavian-Pomeranian Voivodeship, a village in Poland
 Grzywna, West Pomeranian Voivodeship, a hamlet in Poland